Lumbard is a surname. Notable people with the surname include:

J. Edward Lumbard (1901–1999), American judge
Joseph E. B. Lumbard (born 1969), American author and professor
Nicholas Lumbard (died after 1364), Irish barrister and judge

See also
Lombard (surname)

Ethnonymic surnames